The Animal Kingdom Resort Area includes five resorts located near Disney's Animal Kingdom in the Walt Disney World Resort.

Resorts
Disney's All-Star Movies Resort 
Disney's All-Star Music Resort 
Disney's All-Star Sports Resort 
Disney's Animal Kingdom Lodge
Disney's Coronado Springs Resort

Vacation Club Villas
Disney's Animal Kingdom Villas

See also
Disney Springs Resort Area
ESPN Wide World of Sports Resort Area
Epcot Resort Area
Magic Kingdom Resort Area

External links
Disney's Official Resorts Web Page

Animal Kingdom Resort Area